Eurico Carrapatoso ComIH (born February 15, 1962, in Mirandela) is a Portuguese composer.

Awards and honors
2021 - DASCH - Schostakovich Ensemble Prize, with his Pour la fin, pour mon Commencement, for clarinet, violin, cello and piano

2021 - Alumni-Salamanca University Jesús García Bernalt Prize, with his Quando, for mixed choir a cappella

2017 - Performing Rights Society SPA Prize Prémio Autores 2017

2011 - Tree of Life Prize

2006 - UNESCO International Rostrum of Composers, Paris, with his O meu poemário infantil for tenor and orchestra

2004 - Decorated by the President of Portuguese Republic with Commendation of the Order of the Infante Dom Henrique

2001 - National Identity Prize

1999 - Francisco de Lacerda Composition Prize

1999 - UNESCO International Rostrum of Composers, Paris, with his Sorrow on the death of Jorge Peixinho for large orchestra

1998 - UNESCO International Rostrum of Composers, Paris, with his Cinco melodias em forma de Montemel for soprano, horn and piano

1998 - Lopes-Graça Prize from the City of Tomar

Main works

STAGE WORKS

Peer, you're lying!
2001

incidental music for the Ibsen's play Peer Gynt

Opus: 38

Duration (minutes) 110

1(picc).1(ca).1(bcl).1 - hn - perc(2) - pno - 2 vln.vla.vlc.db (with C extension)

Commission: The New Teatro Aberto

First Performance: 24.2.02, Teatro Aberto, Lisbon: Teatro Aberto's Ensemble, Joao Paulo Santos

 Wolf Diogo and Mosquito Valentim
2002

scenic cantata for two singers, speaker, children's choir and orchestra

Opus: 41

Duration (minutes) 50

Instrumentation: 2(2=picc).2.2.2. - 2hn - timp - strings (some basses with C extension)

Singers: Fox Rose (soprano), Wolf Diogo (bass), speaker, children's choir 

Text: Antonio Pires Cabral

Language: Portuguese

Commission: Porto National Orchestra

First Performance: 20.12.02, S.John National Theater, Oporto: Angélica Neto / Jorge Vaz de Carvalho / Paulo Pires / C.P.O. Children's Choir / Porto National Orchestra / Joao Paulo Santos

 The Forest
2004
 
children's opera in two acts and sixteen scenes for five singers and orchestra

Opus: 47

Duration (minutes) 65

Instrumentation: 1(picc).1(ca).1(bcl).1(cbsn).sax(ssax) - 2hn - perc(1) - guit - harp - pno - strings (some basses with C extension)

Singers: Isabel (soprano), Dwarf (bass), Bandit (baritone), Wise man (baritone), Music Teacher (tenor), Tree (speaker), children's choir, male choir (ad libitum) 

Text: Ana Maria Magalhaes and Isabel Alçada after Sophia de Mello Breyner Andresen

Language: Portuguese

Commission: Teatro Nacional de São Carlos (Portuguese National Opera House)

First Performance: 28.2.04, Sao Luiz Theater, Lisbon: Angelica Neto / Jose Corvelo / Armando Possante / Rui Baeta / National Conservatoire Children's Choir / Portuguese Symphony Orchestra / Joao Paulo Santos

 The death of Ludwig II of Bavaria
2010
 
music drama in one act and one scene for soprano, mezzo, chorus and orchestra

Opus: 58

Duration (minutes) 13

Instrumentation: 2hn - timp - strings (some basses with C extension)

Singers: Death (soprano), Providence (mezzo), mixed choir 

Libreto: João Botelho after Bernardo Soares's text (one of Fernando Pessoa heteronyms) Funeral march for Ludwig II of Bavaria (in The Book of Disquiet - 1920's ~ 30's)

Language: Portuguese

Commission: AR DE FILMES

First Performance: 13.12.2010, open space, Sintra Forest (the Glorious Eden, quoting Byron)

 Sabina Freire
2009-2010
 
opera in three acts and thirty scenes for eight singers and orchestra

Opus: 60

Duration (minutes) 120

Instrumentation: 1(picc).1(ca).2(bcl).2(cbsn) - 4hn. 1 - perc(1) - timp - harp - strings (some basses with C extension)

Singers: Sabina (soprano), D. Maria (baritone), Julio (baritone), Epifanio (tenor), Doctor Fino (bass), Padre Correia (tenor), Minister (baritone), Procurador Ferreira (baritone) 

Libreto: Eurico Carrapatoso after Manuel Teixeira Gomes's play Sabina Freire (1905)

Language: Portuguese

Commission: Portimão Municipal Council

First Performance: 11.12.2010, TEMPO Auditorium, Portimão

ORCHESTRAL WORKS

Sorrow on the death of Jorge Peixinho
1998

large orchestra

Opus: 15

Duration (minutes) 18

Instrumentation: 2(2=picc).2(2=ca).2(2=bcl).2(2=cbsn)- 2.2.2.1 - perc(5) - timp - harp - strings (basses with C extension)

Commission: Macao's Music Festival

First Performance: 1.11.98, Sao Domingo's Church, Macao: Porto National Orchestra, Marc Foster

Modes of unlimited expression
1998

Opus: 18

Duration (minutes) 16

Instrumentation: strings

First Performance: 10.10.98, Library of Mafra's National Palace: Lisbon Sinfonietta, Vasco Azevedo

First Recording: La ma de Guido LMG 2047: Lisbon Sinfonietta, Vasco Azevedo

Modes of unlimited expression II
1999

large orchestra

Opus: 20

Duration (minutes) 18

Instrumentation: 2(2=picc).2(2=ca).2(1=picccl 2=bcl).2(2=cbsn)- 2.2.2.1 - perc(1) - timp - harp - pno - strings (some basses with C extension)

Commission: Lisbon Metropolitan Orchestra

First Performance: 9.6.98, Queluz's National Palace: Lisbon Metropolitan Orchestra, Miguel Graça Moura

 Aver-o-mar (Seeing-the-see)
1999

orchestra

Opus: 21

Duration (minutes) 18

Instrumentation: 2(2=picc).2(2=ca).2(1=picccl 2=bcl).2. - 2.2.2.1. - perc(1) - timp - strings (some basses with C extension)

Commission: Povoa's Music Festival

First Performance: 30.7.99, Povoa's Casino: Phillarmonia of Beiras, Osvaldo Ferreira

First Recording: Numerica, NUM 1108: Povoa Symphony Orchestra, Osvaldo Ferreira

 Praxitelic Music for two Gods from Olympus
2004

orchestra

Duration (minutes) 9

Instrumentation: 1.1.1.1. - 2.0.0.0. - perc(1) - harp - strings

Commission: Portuguese Symphony Orchestra and Portuguese National Opera House

First Performance: 12.11.04: Lisbon New University Auditorium, Portuguese Symphony Orchestra, Donato Renzetti

Tempus fugit
2007-2008

large orchestra

Opus: 53

Duration (minutes) 20

Instrumentation: 3(3=picc).3(3=ca).3(2=picccl 3=bcl).2.cbsn- 4.3.3.1 - perc(3) - timp - harp - pno - strings (basses with C extension)

Commission: Rio de Janeiro's Culture Department

First Performance: 23.8.2008, Cecilia Meireles Room, Rio de Janeiro, Brazilian Symphony Orchestra, Flavio Florence

CHORAL - ORCHESTRAL WORKS

Requiem (Passos Manuel in memoriam)
2004

Singers: baritone, mixed choir, orchestra 

Instrumentation: 4 French horns - harp - strings (basses with C extension)

Opus: 48

Commission: Passos Canavarro Foundation

Duration (minutes) 50

Text: Latin Catholic Requiem Mass

Language: Latin

First Performance: 18.1.06, Graca Church, Santarém: Jorge Vaz de Carvalho (baritone), Lisboa Cantat Choir, 
Porto National Orchestra, Joao Paulo Santos

CHORAL WORKS

Drei lieder ohne worte
1997

SATB a-cappella

Duration (minutes) 7

First Performance: 3.11.98, Southwarck Cathedral, London: Lisbon Chamber Choir, Teresita Gutierrez Marques

First Recording: Numerica, NUM 1083: Lisbon Chamber Choir, Teresita Gutierrez Marques

Missa sine nomine
2006

SATB a-cappella

Opus: 50

Duration (minutes) 16

Text: Latin Catholic Mass

Language: Latin

First Performance: 28.9.06, St. Cyprian Church, London: Helios Voices, Sergio Fontao

Our Lady's Diptic
2007

SATB / Organ

Opus: 52

Duration (minutes) 12

Text: Stabat Mater and Salve Regina

Language: Latin

Commission: Lisbon Classical University

First Performance: 16.6.07, Sao Roque Church, Lisbon: Lisbon University Chamber Choir, David Cranmer, Jose Robert

Stabat Mater
2008

Singers: baritone, chamber choir (ssaattbb)

Instrumentation: 1(picc).1(ca).1(bcl) - 1.1(A picc, flugelh) - perc(1) - harp - pno - 2 vl.vla.vc.db (with C extension)

Opus: 54

Duration (minutes) 25

Text: Stabat Mater and Deus Benino (Luis de Camões)

Language: Latin and Portuguese

Commission: Belém Cultural Center (CCB)

First Performance: 18.3.08, Belém Cultural Center, Lisbon: Armando Possante, Olisipo Choir, OrchestrUtopica, Cesario Costa

CHAMBER WORKS

Suite d'Aquem e d'Alem mar
2000

String quartet and marimba

Duration (minutes) 10

First Performance: 1.11.01, Purcell Room, London: Chilingirian Quartet and Pedro Carneiro

In illo tempore
2009

String quartet

Opus: 56

Duration (minutes) 25

Commission: Matosinhos's Municipal Council

First Performance: 12.11.09, Constantino Nery Theater: Matosinhos String Quartet

O espelho da alma (The soul's mirror)
2009

Piano quartet (pno - vl.vla.vc.)

Opus: 57

Duration (minutes) 18

Commission: Torres Vedras's Municipal Council

First Performance: 27.11.09, Torres Vedras Auditorium: Ensemble Darcos

Publishers
Boosey & Hawkes
BIM Editions
Carus-Verlag

Main performers

Conductors

Stefan Asbury, Vasco Azevedo, Joana Carneiro, Pedro Carneiro, Simon Carrington, Nuno Corte-Real, Cesario Costa, Osvaldo Ferreira, Flavio Florence, Mark Foster, Patrick Gallois, Miguel Graca-Moura, Pablo Heras-Casado, Antonio Lourenco, Vytautas Lukocius, Wojciech Michniewski, Misha Rachlevsky, Donato Renzetti, Joao Paulo Santos, Joao Tiago Santos, Ernst Schelle, Brian Schembri, Nils Schweckendiek, Marc Tardue, Cara Tasher, Tapio Tuomela, Maciej Zoltowski

Orchestras

Porto National Orchestra, Portuguese Symphony Orchestra, Lisbon Sinfonietta, Gulbenkian Orchestra, Lisbon Metropolitan Orchestra, Orchestre des Pays de Savoie, Deutsche Oper Berlin Chamber Orchestra, Lithuanian Chamber Orchestra, Brazilian Symphony Orchestra, Chamber Orchestra Kremlin, Finnish Uusinta Kamariorkesteri, Jyväskylä Sinfonia, S.Petersburg Kapella Symphony Orchestra

Ensembles

Remix Ensemble, OrchestrUtopica, Grupo de Musica Contemporanea de Lisboa, Opus Ensemble, Ensemble Darcos, Galliard Ensemble, Chilingirian String Quartet, New Zealand String Quartet, Carion Woodwind Quintet, Ensemble Mediterrain, Matosinhos String Quartet, SONOR Ensemble

Choirs

MDR Rundfunkchor (Philipp Ahmann), The University of Michigan Men's Glee Club (Eugene Rogers), UNF Chamber Singers (Cara Tasher), Estonian Philharmonic Chamber Choir (Daniel Reuss), Gulbenkian Choir (Joana Carneiro), Ars Nova Vocal Ensemble (Katalin Kiss), Coro Casa da Musica (Simon Carrington), Coral de Letras da Universidade do Porto (Borges Coelho)

External links
 Official Website
Biography (MIC)
 Biografia

1962 births
Living people
People from Mirandela
Portuguese composers
Portuguese male composers
University of Porto alumni